The 2020–21 Southern Illinois Salukis men's basketball team represented Southern Illinois University Carbondale during the 2020–21 NCAA Division I men's basketball season. The Salukis were led by second-year head coach Bryan Mullins and played their home games at the Banterra Center (formerly SIU Arena) in Carbondale, Illinois as members of the Missouri Valley Conference. In as season limited due to the ongoing COVID-19 pandemic, the Salukis finished the season 12–14, 5–13 in MVC play to finish in ninth place. They defeated Bradley in the first round of the MVC tournament before losing to Loyola in the quarterfinals.

Previous season
The Salukis finished the 2019–20 season 16–16, 10–8 in MVC play, finishing in fifth place. In the MVC tournament, the Salukis were eliminated by No. 4-seeded Bradley in the quarterfinals.

Roster

Schedule and results

|-
!colspan=12 style=| Non-conference regular season

|-
!colspan=12 style=| Missouri Valley regular season

|-
!colspan=12 style=| MVC tournament

References

2017-18
2020–21 Missouri Valley Conference men's basketball season
2020 in sports in Illinois
2021 in sports in Illinois